PS Isabella was a paddle steamer passenger vessel operated by the London and North Western Railway from 1877 to 1898.

History

She was built by Laird Brothers for the London and North Western Railway in 1877. She was launched on Thursday 11 October 1877 from the Laird Brothers yard in Birkenhead, by Mrs Bland, wife of James Bland, one of the directors of the railway company.

References

1877 ships
Passenger ships of the United Kingdom
Steamships
Ships built on the River Mersey
Ships of the London and North Western Railway
Paddle steamers of the United Kingdom